Andri Ibo (born 3 April 1990) is an Indonesian professional footballer who plays as a defender for Liga 1 club Persis Solo. His older brother Yohan Ibo is also professional footballer.

Club career

Persipura Jayapura
In 2014, Ibo signed a contract with Indonesia Super League club Persipura Jayapura. He made his league debut on 1 February 2014 in a match against Persela Lamongan at the Mandala Stadium, Jayapura.

Barito Putera
In 2019, Andri Ibo signed a contract with Indonesian Liga 1 club Barito Putera. Ibo made his debut on 20 May 2019 in a match against Persija Jakarta at the 17th May Stadium, Banjarmasin.

Persik Kediri
He was signed for Persik Kediri to play in Liga 1 in the 2020 season. Ibo made his debut on 29 February 2020 in a match against Persebaya Surabaya at the Gelora Bung Tomo Stadium, Surabaya. This season was suspended on 27 March 2020 due to the COVID-19 pandemic. The season was abandoned and was declared void on 20 January 2021.

Persis Solo
Ibo was signed for Persis Solo to play in Liga 1 in the 2022–23 season. He made his league debut on 19 August 2022 in a match against Bhayangkara at the Wibawa Mukti Stadium, Cikarang.

International career
He scored in his début match for Indonesia U-23 against Brunei U-23 on August 15, 2013.

International goals
Andri Ibo: International under-23 goals

Honours

Club
Persipura Jayapura
 Indonesia Soccer Championship A: 2016

Country honors
Indonesia U-23
Southeast Asian Games  Silver medal: 2013
Islamic Solidarity Games  Silver medal: 2013

Individual
 Menpora Cup Best Eleven: 2021

References

External links
 Andri Ibo at Soccerway
 Andri Ibo at Liga Indonesia

1990 births
Living people
Indonesian footballers
Papuan sportspeople
People from Jayapura Regency
Liga 1 (Indonesia) players
Persidafon Dafonsoro players
Persipura Jayapura players
PS Barito Putera players
Persik Kediri players
Persis Solo players
Indonesia youth international footballers
Association football defenders
Southeast Asian Games silver medalists for Indonesia
Southeast Asian Games medalists in football
Competitors at the 2013 Southeast Asian Games
Sportspeople from Papua
21st-century Indonesian people